Erick Elliott (born August 12, 1988), better known as Erick Arc Elliott or Erick the Architect, is an American rapper, singer, artist and record producer from Brooklyn, New York. A producer for the hip hop trio, Flatbush Zombies, Elliot has released multiple solo projects as well.

Elliott plays multiple instruments including the keyboard, piano, and the guitar.

Discography

Studio albums

EPs

Mixtapes

Singles

Guest appearances

Erick Arc Elliott's Artwork and Books

Coinciding with his name, the Erick the Architect is a prolific artist on a number of levels. Most recently, Elliott has demonstrated that he is indeed a serious conventional artist and has created numerous paintings and other artistic designs that the fans are quickly taking note of. On the surface, it appears that Elliott ties his artwork into his music in some fashion that allows both skills to coexist fluidly and favorably in a way that very few artists have been able to do successfully.

Much of Elliott's art is created and is directly affiliated and attached to 502 North Pole (www.502northpole.com).

Book Titles by Erick Elliott:

Spring Forward: Aspire to Inspire (2016)

References

1988 births
Living people
Rappers from Brooklyn
American musicians of Jamaican descent
People from Flatbush, Brooklyn
21st-century American rappers
Beast Coast members